The Mirror is a lost 1917 silent film drama directed by Frank Powell and starring Robert Elliott and Marjorie Rambeau. The film was distributed by the Mutual Film Company.

Cast
Robert Elliott as Bob Merrill
Marjorie Rambeau as Blanche
Irene Warfield as Maizie Goddard
Paul Everton as Boyd
Aubrey Beattie as Stage Director
Frank A. Ford as Backer
T. Jerome Lawler as Russell Dana (as T. Jerome Lawlor)
Agnes Ayres

References

External links

1917 films
American silent feature films
Lost American films
Films directed by Frank Powell
American black-and-white films
Silent American drama films
1917 drama films
1917 lost films
Lost drama films
1910s American films